The IBM 700/7000 series is a series of large-scale (mainframe) computer systems that were made by IBM through the 1950s and early 1960s. The series includes several different, incompatible processor architectures. The 700s use vacuum-tube logic and were made obsolete by the introduction of the transistorized 7000s. The 7000s, in turn, were eventually replaced with System/360, which was announced in 1964. However the 360/65, the first 360 powerful enough to replace 7000s, did not become available until November 1965. Early problems with OS/360 and the high cost of converting software kept many 7000s in service for years afterward.

Architectures
The IBM 700/7000 series has six completely different ways of storing data and instructions:
First scientific (36/18-bit words): 701 (Defense Calculator)
Later scientific (36-bit words, hardware floating-point): 704, 709, 7040, 7044, 7090, 7094
Commercial (variable-length character strings): 702, 705, 7080
1400 series (variable-length character strings): 7010
Decimal (10-digit words): 7070, 7072, 7074
Supercomputer (64-bit words): 7030 "Stretch"

The 700 class use vacuum tubes, the 7000 class is transistorized. All machines (like most other computers of the time) use magnetic core memory; except for early 701 and 702 models, which initially used Williams tube CRT memory and were later converted to magnetic core memory.

Software compatibility issues
Early computers were sold without software. As operating systems began to emerge, having four different mainframe architectures plus the 1400 midline architectures became a major problem for IBM since it meant at least four different programming efforts were required.

The System/360 combines the best features of the 7000 and 1400 series architectures into a single design both for commercial computing and for scientific and engineering computing. However, its architecture is not compatible with those of the 7000 and 1400 series, so some 360 models have optional features that allow them to emulate the 1400 and 7000 instruction sets in microcode. One of the selling points of the System/370, the successor of the 360 introduced in mid-1970, was improved 1400/7000 series emulation, which could be done under operating system control rather than shutting down and restarting in emulation mode as was required for emulation of 7040/44, 7070/72/74, 7080 and 7090/94 on all of the 360s except the 360/85.

Peripherals
While the architectures differ, the machines in the same class use the same electronics technologies and generally use the same peripherals. Tape drives generally use 7-track format, with the IBM 727 for vacuum tube machines and the 729 for transistor machines. Both the vacuum tube and most transistor models use the same card readers, card punches, and line printers that were introduced with the 701. These units, the IBM 711, 721, and 716, are based on IBM accounting machine technology and even include plugboard control panels. They are relatively slow and it was common for 7000 series installations to include an IBM 1401, with its much faster peripherals, to do card-to-tape and tape-to-line-printer operations off-line. Three later machines, the 7010, the 7040 and the 7044, adopted peripherals from the midline IBM 1400 series. Some of the technology for the 7030 was used in data channels and peripheral devices on other 7000 series computers, e.g., 7340 Hypertape.

First scientific architecture (701)

Known as the Defense Calculator while in development in the IBM Poughkeepsie Laboratory, this machine was formally unveiled April 7, 1953 as the IBM 701 Electronic Data Processing Machine.

Data formats
Numbers are either 36 bits or 18 bits long, only fixed point.
Fixed-point numbers are stored in binary sign/magnitude format.

Instruction format
Instructions are 18 bits long, single address.
Sign (1 bit) – Whole-word (-) or Half-word (+) operand address
Opcode (5 bits) – 32 instructions
Address (12 bits) – 4096 Half-word addresses

To expand the memory from 2048 to 4096 words, a 33rd instruction was added that uses the most-significant bit of its address field to select the bank. (This instruction was probably created using the "No OP" instruction, which appears to have been the only instruction with unused bits, as it originally ignored its address field. However, documentation on this new instruction is not currently available.)

Registers
Processor registers consisted of:
AC  – 38-bit Accumulator
MQ – 36-bit Multiplier-Quotient

Memory
2,048 or 4,096 – 36-bit binary words with six-bit characters

Later scientific architecture (704/709/7090/7094)

IBM's 36-bit scientific architecture was used for a variety of computation-intensive applications. First machines were the vacuum-tube 704 and 709, followed by the transistorized 7090, 7094, 7094-II, and the lower-cost 7040 and 7044. The ultimate model was the Direct Coupled System (DCS) consisting of a 7094 linked to a 7044 that handled input and output operations.

Data formats
Numbers are 36 bits long, both fixed point and floating point.
Fixed-point numbers are stored in binary sign/magnitude format.
Single-precision floating-point numbers have a magnitude sign, an 8-bit excess-128 exponent and a 27-bit magnitude
Double-precision floating-point numbers, introduced on the 7094, have a magnitude sign, a 17-bit excess-65536 exponent, and a 54-bit magnitude
Alphameric  characters are 6-bit BCD, packed six to a word.

Instruction format
The basic instruction format is a three-bit prefix, fifteen-bit decrement, three-bit tag, and fifteen-bit address. The prefix field specifies the class of instruction. The decrement field often contains an immediate operand to modify the results of the operation, or is used to further define the instruction type. The three bits of the tag specify three (seven in the 7094) index registers, the contents of which are subtracted from the address to produce an effective address. The address field either contains an address or an immediate operand.

Registers

Processor registers consisted of:
AC  – 38-bit Accumulator
MQ – 36-bit Multiplier-Quotient
XR  – 15-bit Index Registers (three or seven)
SI    – 36-bit Sense Indicator

The accumulator (and multiplier-quotient) registers operate in sign/magnitude format.

The Index registers operate using two's complement format and when used to modify an instruction address are subtracted from the address in the instruction. On machines with three index registers, if the tag has two or three bits set (i.e. selected multiple registers) then their values are ORed together before being subtracted. The IBM 7094, with seven index registers has a "compatibility" mode to permit programs from earlier machines that used this trick to continue to be used.

The Sense Indicators permit interaction with the operator via panel switches and lights.

Memory
704: 4,096 or 8,192 or 32,768 – 36-bit binary words with six-bit characters
709, 7090, 7094, 7094 II, 7040, 7044: 32,768 – 36-bit binary words with six-bit characters

Input/output
The 709/7090 series use Data Synchronizer Channels for high speed input/output, such as tape and disk. The basic 7-bit DSCs, e.g., 7607, execute their own simple programs from the computer memory that controls the transfer of data between memory and the I/O devices; the more advanced 9-bit 7909 supports more sophisticated channel programs. Because the unit record equipment on the 709x was so slow, Punched card I/O and high-speed printing were often performed by transferring magnetic tapes to and from an off-line IBM 1401. Later, the data channels were used to connect a 7090 to a 7040 or a 7094 to a 7044 to form the IBM 7094/7044 Direct Coupled System (DCS). In that configuration, the 7044, which could use faster 1400 series peripherals, primarily handled I/O.

FORTRAN assembly program
The FORTRAN Assembly Program (FAP) is an assembler for the 709, 7090, and 7094 under IBM's makeshift FMS (Fortran Monitor System) and IBSYS operating systems. An earlier assembler was SCAT (SHARE Compiler-Assembler-Translator). Macros were added to FAP by Bell Laboratories (BE-FAP), and the final 7090/7094 assembler was IBMAP, under IBSYS/IBJOB.

Its pseudo-operation BSS, used to reserve memory, is the origin of the common name of the "BSS section", still used in many assembly languages today for designating reserved memory address ranges of the type not having to be saved in the executable image.

Commercial architecture (702/705/7080)

The IBM 702 and IBM 705 are similar, and the 705 can run many 702 programs without modification, but they are not completely compatible.

The IBM 7080 is a transistorized version of the 705, with various improvements. For backward compatibility it can be run in 705 I mode, 705 II mode, 705 III mode, or full 7080 mode.

Data format
Data is represented by a variable-length string of characters terminated by a Record mark.

Instruction format
Five characters: one character opcode and four character address – OAAAA

Registers
702
two Accumulators (A & B) – 512 characters
705
one Accumulator – 256 characters
14 auxiliary storage units – 16 characters
one auxiliary storage unit – 32 characters
7080
one Accumulator – 256 characters
30 auxiliary storage units – 512 characters
32 communication storage units – 8 characters

Memory
702
2,000 to 10,000 characters in Williams tubes (in increments of 2,000 characters)
Character cycle rate – 23 microseconds
705 (models I, II, or III)
20,000 or 40,000 or 80,000 characters of core memory
Character cycle rate – 17 microseconds or 9.8 microseconds
7080
80,000 or 160,000 characters of Core memory
Character cycle rate – 2.18 microseconds

Input/output
The 705 and the basic 7080 use channels with a 7-bit interface. The 7080 can be equipped with 7908 data channels to attach faster devices using a 9-bit interface.

1400 series architecture (7010)

The 700/7000 commercial architecture inspired the very successful IBM 1400 series of mid-sized business computers. In turn, IBM later introduced a mainframe version of the IBM 1410 called the IBM 7010.

Data format
Data is represented by a variable length string of characters terminated by a word mark.

Instruction format
Variable length: 1, 2, 6, 7, 11, or 12 characters.

Registers
Fifteen five-character fields in fixed locations in low memory can be treated as index registers, whose values can be added to the address specified in an instruction. Also, certain internal registers that would today be invisible, such as the addresses of the characters being currently processed, are exposed to the programmer; in particular, the B address register is often used for subroutine linkage.

Memory
100,000 characters

Decimal architecture (7070/7072/7074)

The IBM 7070, IBM 7072, and IBM 7074 are decimal, fixed-word-length machines. They use a ten-digit word like the smaller and older IBM 650, but are not instruction set compatible with the 650.

Data format
Word length – 10 decimal digits plus sign
Digit encoding – two-out-of-five code
Floating point – optional, with a two-digit exponent
Three signs for each word – Plus, Minus, and Alpha
Plus and Minus indicate 10-digit numeric values
Alpha indicates five characters of text coded by pairs of digits. 61 = A, 91 = 1.

Instruction format
All instructions use one word
Two-digit opcode (including sign, Plus or Minus only)
Two-digit index register
Two-digit field control – allows selecting sets of digits, shifting left or right
Four-digit address

Registers
All registers use one word and can also be addressed as memory.
Accumulators – three (addresses 9991, 9992, and 9993 – standard; 99991, 99992, and 99993 – extended 7074)
Program register – one (address 9995 – standard; 99995 – extended 7074)
Addressable from console only. Stores current instruction.
Instruction counter – one (address 9999 – standard; 99999 – extended 7074)
Addressable from console only
Index registers – 99 (addresses 0001-0099)

Memory
5000 to 9990 words (standard)
15000 to 30000 words (extended 7074)
Access time – 6 microseconds (7070/7072), 4 microseconds (7074)
Add time – 72 microseconds (7070), 12 microseconds (7072), 10 microseconds (7074)

Input/output
The 707x uses channels with a 7-bit interface. The 7070 and 7074 can be equipped with 7907 data channels to attach faster devices using a 9-bit interface.

Timeline

An IBM 7074 was used by the U.S. Internal Revenue Service in 1962.

The IBM 7700 Data Acquisition System is not a member of the IBM 7000 series, despite its number and its announcement date of December 2, 1963.

Performance
All of the 700 and 7000 series machines predate standard performance measurement tools such as the Whetstone (1972), Dhrystone (1984), LINPACK (1979), or Livermore loops (1986) benchmarks.

In the table below, the Gibson and Knight measurements report speed, where higher numbers are better; the TRIDIA measurement reports time, where lower numbers are better.

See also 
 IBM 650

Notes

References

External links

IBM Mainframe family tree
The Architecture of IBM's Early Computers (PDF)
C Gordon Bell, Computer Structures: Readings and Examples, McGraw-Hill, 1971; part 6, section 1, "The IBM 701-7094 II Sequence, a Family by Evolution", 
IBM 705
IBM 7030 Stretch
IBM 7070
IBM 7094
IBM 7090/94 Architecture
Jack Harper's FAP page
Birth of an Unwanted IBM Computer, by Bob Bemer

Reference manuals
701

702

704

705

7010

7030

7040/7044

7070/7072/7074

7080

7090/7094

 
Series
Series